Zarin-e Olya (also Romanized as Zarīn-e ‘Olyā; also known as Zardīn-e ‘Olyā and Zardīn-e Bālā) is a village in Aliabad Rural District, in the Central District of Hashtrud County, East Azerbaijan Province, Iran. At the 2006 census, its population was 36, in 10 families.

References 

Towns and villages in Hashtrud County